During the 2007–08 English football season, Hull City A.F.C. competed in the Football League Championship.

Season summary
Hull finished a mere four points adrift of second-placed Stoke City for promotion to the Premier League, qualifying for the play-offs instead. After trouncing Watford 6–1 over two legs, Hull City reached Wembley to play a Bristol City side aiming for a second successive promotion. A single Dean Windass goal gave Hull the game and promotion to English football's top flight for the first time in Hull's history. Promotion was made all the more incredible considering that five seasons ago Hull were languishing in the bottom tier of the Football League, and that when manager Phil Brown had taken the managerial role at Hull in December 2006 the club were in the Championship relegation zone.

Players

First-team squad

Left club during season

Statistics

Starting 11
Considering starts in all competitions
 GK:  Boaz Myhill, 46
 RB:  Sam Ricketts, 45
 CB:  Michael Turner, 48
 CB:  Wayne Brown, 44
 LB:  Andy Dawson, 25
 RM:  Richard Garcia, 36
 CM:  Ian Ashbee, 43
 CM:  Dean Marney, 36
 LM:  Bryan Hughes, 27
 CF:  Fraizer Campbell, 32
 CF:  Dean Windass, 29

Football League Championship

Results by round

Matches

Playoffs

Final

League table

FA Cup

League Cup

Notes

References

Hull City A.F.C. seasons
Hull City
2000s in Kingston upon Hull